The  are a  plateau in upper Marsica, a subregion of Abruzzo, in central Italy.

Description 
The plains, located between  a.s.l., are surrounded by mountain reliefs such as those of the Sirente-Velino group, Mount San Nicola, the Mount Bove massif (Carseolan Mountains), and the Mount Salviano range. Mounts Aurunzo and Girifalco separate the plains from the Nerfa Valley.

This plateau is adjacent to the Fucino plain in the east, and to the upper Cicolano valley in the northwest part, falling within the territories of the municipalities of Avezzano, Capistrello, Magliano de' Marsi, Scurcola Marsicana, and Tagliacozzo. The small Terramone depression, situated between the Cappelle dei Marsi and Magliano de' Marsi territories, is part of the area. The plateau is mostly for agricultural use.

Origin of the name 
The origin of the name is not clear. According to one hypothesis, it would be related to Pales, a deity of Roman mythology, protecting shepherds, flocks and livestock.

History 
Thanks to numerous archaeological finds, it was ascertained that, in the Roman age, after the foundation of the colony of Alba Fucens, the whole area underwent a centuriation and the various pieces of land that had been so delimited were granted to Latin settlers. A few years after the first draining of Fucino operated by Emperor Claudius, through the building of the tunnels of the same name between 41 and 52 AD, the Piani Palentini were provided with an aqueduct to serve country villas and facilitate farming activities.

Battle of Tagliacozzo 

In 1268 the Battle of Tagliacozzo was fought in this location, which saw Conradin of Hohenstaufen's defeat, causing the fall of the House of Swabia from the Sicilian throne and Charles I of Anjou's supremacy in the Italian territory.

Landmarks 

 Necropolis of the Piani Palentini in the Scurcola Marsicana territory 
 Aurunzo aqueduct, an underground canal designed by Consul Lucius Arruntius and built between 41 and 54 AD, in the same period as the building of tunnels of Claudius at the base of Mount Aurunzo between Castellafiume and Corcumello.
 Rocca Orsini in Scurcola Marsicana 
 Church of Santa Lucia in Magliano de' Marsi 
 Remains of the supposed tomb of King Perseus of Macedon (Magliano de' Marsi)
 Medieval villages of Corcumello and Rosciolo dei Marsi
 Church of Santa Maria in Valle Porclaneta (Rosciolo dei Marsi)
 Historical centre of Tagliacozzo 
 Sanctuary of the Madonna dell'Oriente in Tagliacozzo
 Palentine Caves in the Salviano mountain range
 Orsini-Colonna Castle

References

Further reading 
 

Abruzzo
Marsica
Plateaus of Italy
Valleys of Italy